Khypar (lit. News) is a Chuvash language newspaper.

It was founded in 1906 in Kazan, moving to Cheboksary in 1918.

Previous names: «Канаш», «Чӑваш коммунӗ», «Коммунизм ялавӗ». It received the current name on 30 August 1990.

Newspaper's founder and first editor N. Nikolsky defined the main task - to serve the Chuvash people.

Links 
 Official site
 Страница газеты на портале «СМИ Чувашии»

Newspapers published in Russia
Newspapers published in the Soviet Union
Chuvash-language mass media
Cheboksary